Cupid is an American comedy-drama television series created by Rob Thomas that aired on ABC from September 26, 1998 to February 11, 1999 and which featured Paula Marshall as Dr. Claire Allen, a Chicago psychologist who is given charge of a man named Trevor Hale (Jeremy Piven). Hale believes he is Cupid, sent down from Mount Olympus by Zeus to connect 100 couples without using his powers, as a punishment for his arrogance.

Originally broadcast on ABC on Saturday evenings at 10 p.m. EST, the show lasted one season.

Plot

Trevor Hale is attractive, witty, uncommonly intelligent—and he may be Cupid, the Greco-Roman god of erotic love. Probably not, but he thinks so. Trevor's insistence that he is Cupid lands him in a mental hospital, where he meets psychologist Claire Allen, a renowned authority on romance. Trevor tells Claire that he has been stripped of his godly powers by Zeus, and exiled from Mount Olympus as a punishment for arrogance. To win his way back among the gods, Trevor must unite 100 couples in everlasting love, without his bow and arrows. Claire does not believe in Cupid, but she risks her career by releasing Trevor from the hospital, assuming responsibility for his behavior. Trevor finds work as a bartender, and regularly disrupts Claire's group therapy sessions. All the while, he plots his campaign to promote romance, and earn his way back to Olympus. While encouraging sexual abandon in others, Trevor remains chaste; he believes sex with a mortal will confine him to Earth forever.

Cast

Main
 Jeremy Piven as Cupid / Trevor Hale
 Paula Marshall as Dr. Claire Allen
 Jeffrey D. Sams as Champ Terrace

Recurring
 Paul Adelstein as Mike
 Noelle Bou-Sliman as Tina
 Daniel Bryant as Laurence
 Melanie Deanne Moore as Jaclyn
 Jeffrey Vincent Parise as Nick
 Geryll Robinson as Chris

Notable guest stars
 Joe Flanigan as Alex
 Hollis Resnik as Linda
 Tim DeKay
 Connie Britton
 Laura Leighton
 Lisa Loeb
 Tiffani Thiessen

Episodes
Fifteen episodes were produced, and fourteen episodes were aired. Two additional episodes titled "Company Pier" and "Chapter Six" were scripted, but were never filmed.

Production
In an Entertainment Weekly article from December 2004, creator Rob Thomas mentions that the show would have ended with Trevor and Claire becoming Trevor's 100th match—and without revealing whether Trevor really was Cupid.

Staff
 Rob Thomas – Creator, executive producer, supervising producer
 Scott Winant – Executive producer, director
 Joe Voci – Executive producer
 Scott Sanders – Executive producer
 Jeff Reno – Executive producer
 Ron Osborn – Executive producer
 Hart Hanson – Co-Executive Producer
 W.G. "Snuffy" Walden – Composer

Reception
E! Online named Cupid as #4 on its "Top Ten Shows Cancelled Before Their Time".

Show revival

ABC and Rob Thomas brought Cupid back to the airwaves with an October 2007 deal for which scripts and production were approved in March 2008.  The series was relocated to New York City and cast Bobby Cannavale as Trevor and Sarah Paulson as Claire.  Only seven episodes of the revival series aired, from March 31 – June 16, 2009.

References

External links

 
 
 Creator Rob Thomas’s site, including show synopsis, reviews and scripts for unaired episodes.

 
American Broadcasting Company original programming
1990s American comedy-drama television series
1998 American television series debuts
1999 American television series endings
Television series by Sony Pictures Television
Television shows set in Chicago